Iberesia is a genus of spiders in the family Nemesiidae. It was first described in 2006 by Decae & Cardoso. , it contains 6 Mediterranean species.

Species
, the World Spider Catalog accepted 3 species:
 Iberesia arturica Calvo, 2020 — Spain
 Iberesia barbara (Lucas, 1846) — Morocco, Algeria, Spain
 Iberesia brauni (L. Koch, 1882) — Spain (incl. Balearic Is.)
 Iberesia castillana (Frade & Bacelar, 1931) — Spain
 Iberesia machadoi Decae & Cardoso, 2006 (type) — Portugal, Spain
 Iberesia valdemoriana Luis de la Iglesia, 2019 — Spain

References

Nemesiidae
Mygalomorphae genera
Spiders of Africa